The 2019 Murcia Open was a professional tennis tournament played on clay courts. It was the 1st edition of the tournament which was part of the 2019 ATP Challenger Tour. It took place in Murcia, Spain between 8 and 14 April 2019.

Singles main-draw entrants

Seeds

 1 Rankings are as of 1 April 2019.

Other entrants
The following players received wildcards into the singles main draw:
  Carlos Alcaraz
  Nicolás Almagro
  Ivan Gakhov
  Gerard Granollers
  Carlos López Montagud

The following player received entry into the singles main draw as a special exempt:
  Pedro Martínez

The following player received entry into the singles main draw as an alternate:
  Pere Riba

The following players received entry into the singles main draw using their ITF World Tennis Ranking:
  Riccardo Bonadio
  Raúl Brancaccio
  Ivan Nedelko
  David Pérez Sanz
  Oriol Roca Batalla

The following players received entry from the qualifying draw:
  Andrea Vavassori
  David Vega Hernández

The following player received entry as a lucky loser:
  Fabrício Neis

Champions

Singles

 Roberto Carballés Baena def.  Mikael Ymer 2–6, 6–0, 6–2.

Doubles

 Marcus Daniell /  David Marrero def.  Rameez Junaid /  Andrei Vasilevski 6–4, 6–4.

References

2019 ATP Challenger Tour
2019 in Spanish sport
April 2019 sports events in Spain